The 1974 USAC Championship Car season consisted of 14 races, beginning in Ontario, California on March 3 and concluding in Avondale, Arizona on November 2.  The USAC National Champion was Bobby Unser and the Indianapolis 500 winner was Johnny Rutherford. Due to the events of the 1973 Indianapolis 500 significant improvements were made to the cars for safety concerns. Wings were reduced in size, and pop-off valves were added to the turbocharger plenums in order to reduce horsepower and curtail speeds.

Schedule and results

All races running on Oval/Speedway.

Final points standings

Note 1: Jim Hurtubise, Skip Barber, David Hobbs, Sam Posey and Evan Noyes are not eligible for points.
Note 2: Jerry Grant did not obtain a USAC license until after the Ontario event, making him ineligible for points for the first two races of the year.

References
 
 
 
 
 http://media.indycar.com/pdf/2011/IICS_2011_Historical_Record_Book_INT6.pdf  (p. 223-224)

See also
 1974 Indianapolis 500

USAC Championship Car season
USAC Championship Car
1974 in American motorsport